Cynthia Cooper may refer to:

Cynthia Cooper-Dyke, née Cynthia Cooper, basketball player
Cynthia Cooper (accountant), whistleblower who exposed fraud at Worldcom